Tocumen International Airport  is the primary international airport serving Panama City, the capital of Panama. The airport serves as the homebase for Copa Airlines and is a regional hub to and from The Caribbean, South, North and Central America and additionally features routes to some European and Asian cities.

History

During World War II, Panamanian airports were leased exclusively by the U.S. Armed Forces. The nearest airport to Tocumen was the Paitilla Point Airfield. Several airports were built to protect the Panama Canal from foreign aggression. The 37th Pursuit Group at Albrook Field replaced the P-40 Warhawks of the 28th Pursuit Squadron at the Paitilla Point airbase from 9 December 1941 though 26 March 1942 in the immediate aftermath of the Pearl Harbor attack.

Tocumen International Airport was inaugurated on June 1, 1947, by President Enrique Adolfo Jiménez, and airport operations began before the construction works were completed. The administrative building/passenger terminal was inaugurated seven years later, during the administration of Colonel José Antonio Remón Cantera. As time passed, and due to Panama's role as a country of transit, that terminal became too small to attend to the growing demand for air operations. These circumstances compelled the aeronautical authorities at the time to consider expanding the airport. Work on the new buildings began in 1971.

In order to build the structure that currently houses the current passenger terminal, a lot of soil had to be moved and the bed of the Tocumen river had to be diverted from its original site. The current passenger terminal was inaugurated on August 15, 1978, and operations began on September 5 of the same year. The Tocumen International Airport is one of the few airports in the region that has two landing runways able to serve the largest commercial aircraft operating today.
The name of the airport was changed in 1981 by the military government to Omar Torrijos International Airport, in honor of the Panamanian leader who died on July 31, 1981, at the age of 52 in a plane crash in Cerro Marta, Coclesito in very bad conditions. After nine years, the original name was reestablished after the fall of the dictatorship of Panama by the U.S. invasion of 1989, when the airport was seized by 82nd Airborne Division paratroopers.
The original runway (03L/21R) is mainly used for cargo and private flights, but also as a supplement to the primary runway during peak traffic periods. I enabled. Until May 31, 2003, Tocumen International Airport was managed by the Civil Aeronautics Directorate (which is known today as the Civil Aeronautics Authority). On June 1 of that year, an innovative terminal management platform was created through Law No. 23 of January 29, 2003, which set out a regulatory framework for the management of airports and landing strips in Panama. This law allowed the creation of Aeropuerto Internacional de Tocumen, S.A., also referred to as Tocumen, S.A., which currently manages the terminal. This law is one of a number of laws that restructured the aeronautical sector in Panama to further its improvement and modernization.

In August 2015, it was announced that Emirates would operate flights to Tocumen International Airport from Dubai starting February 2016, at which point it would have become the world's longest non-stop flight. In January 2016, the route was delayed due to a lack of economic opportunities for the flight. It has not yet been announced when the flight will begin regularly scheduled operations. It was planned to make the route between Tocumen International Airport and Dubai the longest flight in the world, until Emirates started flying between Dubai and Auckland.

On 16 March 2023, Aeropuerto metro station of Panama Metro was open in the airport.

Expansion

First phase

In 2006, Tocumen S.A. started a major expansion and renovation program. The main passenger terminal was expanded  at a cost of approximately US$21 million. New boarding gates were built to allow more flights to and from Panama, and to facilitate the growth of commercial and internal circulation areas.

Tocumen airport administration acquired 22 new boarding bridges and replaced the oldest 14. This included the addition of 6 remote positions, hence allowing Tocumen Airport to have a total of 28 boarding gates. The new installations were opened in 2006. The airport also has a VIP lounge, Copa Club, operated by the partnership between United Airlines and Copa Airlines that caters to Copa's partner airlines and Star Alliance members. It also had an Admirals Club for American Airlines, which closed on June 30, 2012.  The Lounge Panama, a VIP airport lounge operated by Global Lounge Network started operations at Tocumen on January 9, 2019.

The next step of the modernization project was the purchasing of new equipment to provide service and support to the common areas of the airport. New equipment included: modern boarding gates and elevators, luggage conveyor belts, flight information system, and revamping the air conditioning system.

The renovation of the old Tocumen international airport (originally built in 1947) to be used solely as a cargo terminal, was the last step of the modernization project of Tocumen international airport. It included the redesign of the central building, the construction of new buildings for cargo companies among other improvements.

Second phase
The second expansion phase of Tocumen International airport is the Northern Terminal. At a cost of US$60 million, a completely new terminal with 12 additional terminal gates was built. With these 12 new gates plus the existing 22 gates and the six remote aircraft docks, there is a total of 40 gates. The new facilities included the platforms, taxiways and a new road which connect both the cargo terminal and the airport's administration building. The Muelle Norte is linked to the main passenger terminal and have 10 moving walkways for passengers and  commercial areas. The luggage sorting system was expanded to accommodate increased demand. The tender for the design of the second phase was given to Ecuador-based Planman Cia Ltda. Colombia-based Aerotocumen won the tender of the construction of the North Terminal.

Third phase
The South Terminal started a bidding process during the first half of 2012 and the contract was acquired by the Brazilian company Odebrecht. Tocumen S.A. made an investment of US$780 million, which included 20 additional gates. It included the construction of a new terminal, hundreds of parking spots, Tocumen river diversion, and four new direct-access lanes to the airport. The new terminal was officially inaugurated on April 29, 2019 and started operations on June 22, 2022.

Airlines and destinations

Passenger

Cargo

Statistics

Annual traffic

Busiest routes

See also
Transport in Panama
List of airports in Panama

References

External links

Official website
Our Airports - Tocumen International Airport

La Prensa de Panama Report 2015 Website

Airfields of the United States Army Air Forces in Panama
Airports in Panama
Panama City
Airports established in 1947
1947 establishments in Panama